Grimshaw is a town in northern Alberta, Canada. By virtue of being the original starting point of Highway 35, which leads to the Northwest Territories, Grimshaw is referred to as Mile Zero of the Mackenzie Highway.

History 
The town was named after Dr. M.E. Grimshaw, a pioneer doctor from Kingston, Ontario who settled in Peace River (then known as Peace River Crossing) in 1914. He practiced in the area for many years and also served at different capacities in the local government at the county and the village levels until 1922, retiring from politics as the mayor of Peace River. In 1929 he moved his family to Fairview, where he died in November of that year. Dr. Grimshaw would later be the posthumous father-in-law of actor John Carradine, who was married to Grimshaw's daughter, Doris Grimshaw (Doris Erving, Doris Rich), from 1957 until her death in 1971.

Timeline
 1917: Grimshaw's location was chosen by the Central Canada Railway.
 1921: Originally surveyed by Alfred Driscoll.
 1930: The hamlet was incorporated as the "Village of Grimshaw".
 1953: Grimshaw was incorporated as a town.

Demographics 

Economy 
Having developed first as a community centre for a rich mixed farming district, Grimshaw's economy has transformed to become a distribution centre for northern Alberta.

Arts and culture 
Some annual festivals and events in the Grimshaw area include the following:
Family Day Celebration in February at Lac Cardinal
Alberta Pond Hockey tournament in February at Lac Cardinal
Senior Citizens Week Celebration in June
Annual Country Fair in June
Pioneer Days at Lac Cardinal Pioneer Village Museum in August
North Peace Stampede in August at Lac Cardinal Recreation Area
Annual Terry Fox Run in September
Old Fashioned Family Christmas Event at Lac Cardinal Pioneer Museum in December

Attractions 
The Town of Grimshaw has numerous indoor and outdoor recreational facilities within its borders including an outdoor swimming pool, an arena, a curling rink, a family fitness centre, 6 Ball Diamonds, SK8 "N" Bike Park, an R.V. Park and a Seniors Drop In Centre.

The Historic Mile 0 Mackenzie Park and the Tom Baldwin Memorial Arboretum located at the corner of Highway 2 and Highway 2A are fully landscaped passive recreational interpretive park reflecting local and regional history. The history of the communities along the Mackenzie Highway is reflected by interpretive signs situated along the walking path. The Tom Baldwin Memorial Arboretum provides an educational component to visitors and the local schools to learn about the different species of trees in the area forests.
Queen Elizabeth Provincial Park and Lac Cardinal Recreation Area on the shores of Lac Cardinal are less than 10 kilometres to the northwest of Grimshaw. Wilderness Park is less than 5 kilometres to the northeast of Grimshaw.

Museums include the Lac Cardinal Pioneer Village Museum and the Mile 0 Antique Museum, which closed in 2014. Located within Lac Cardinal Recreation Area, the Lac Cardinal Pioneer Village Museum features buildings from a pioneer townsite. The Mile 0 Antique Truck Museum displayed trucks used in northern cartage in the 1930s through 1950s. The museum specialized in International Trucks, and had many that were fully restored to show room condition. The museum was nominated for numerous awards before its closure.

Infrastructure

Health care 
The Grimshaw Berwyn & District Community Health Centre provides the health needs of residents for Grimshaw, Berwyn and nearby communities. Other hospitals in the area include the Peace River Community Health Centre in Peace River, and the Manning Community Health Centre in Manning.

The medical clinic is located in the town's downtown core. Dental services are also available in Grimshaw.

Education 
Public schools in Grimshaw include the Grimshaw Public School (Grades K to 12). Separate schools include Holy Family Elementary School (Grades K to 9) with
senior high school students being bussed to Glenmary School [Grades 7-12] in Peace River.

Post-secondary education is available at Northern Lakes College in the Peace River Campus.

Media 
Grimshaw is served weekly by the Mile Zero News and bi-weekly by alternative newspaper The Vault Magazine.

Government 
Grimshaw is in the Peace River federal electoral district, served by Chris Warkentin.  In the next federal election, Grimshaw will become part of the newly formed riding of Peace River—Westlock.

See also 
List of communities in Alberta
List of towns in Alberta

References

External links 

1930 establishments in Alberta
Towns in Alberta